The 2014 season is Yokohama F. Marinos' 43rd season of competitive football – its thirty-third season in the top division of Japanese football and its fifteenth season under its current name, since the merger of Yokohama Marinos and Yokohama Flügels in 1999.

Competitions

Japanese Super Cup

J.League

League table

Matches

Emperor's Cup

J.League Cup

AFC Champions League

Group stage

Squad information

Playing statistics

Appearances (Apps.) numbers are for appearances in competitive games only including sub appearances

Goalscorers
Includes all competitive matches. The list is sorted alphabetically by surname when total goals are equal.

Correct as of game played on 18 May 2014

See also
List of Yokohama F. Marinos seasons

References

Japanese football clubs 2014 season
2014